Anupama Rawat is an Indian politician and the MLA from Haridwar Rural Assembly constituency. She is a member of the Indian National Congress. She is general secretary of Mahila Congress.

References 

Living people
Indian National Congress politicians
Uttarakhand politicians
People from Haridwar district
Uttarakhand MLAs 2022–2027
Year of birth missing (living people)